HMS Apollo was a batch 3B broadbeam  of the Royal Navy. She was, like the rest of the class, named after a figure of mythology. Apollo was built by Yarrow Shipbuilders of Scotstoun. She was launched on 15 October 1970 and commissioned on 28 May 1972, making her the penultimate Leander.

Both Apollo and Ariadne are easily distinguished from the other Leanders by their 'witches hat' – fitted to the top of the foremast as a part of the electronic warfare array.

Construction
Apollo was one of two Leander-class frigates ordered on 29 July 1968 for the Royal Navy under the 1967–68 construction programme, the other being  and were the last two Leanders built for the Royal Navy. She was laid down at Yarrow Shipbuilders' Scotstoun, Glasgow shipyard on 1 May 1969 as Yard number 1002. She was launched on 15 October 1970 and commissioned on 10 June 1972 with the Pennant number F70.

Displacement was  standard and  full load.

A twin 4.5-inch (113 mm) Mark 6 gun mount was fitted forward. A single Sea Cat surface-to-air missile launcher was fitted aft (on the Helicopter hangar roof), while two Oerlikon 20mm cannon provided close-in defence.  A Limbo anti-submarine mortar was fitted aft to provide a short-range anti-submarine capability, while a hangar and helicopter deck allowed a single Westland Wasp helicopter to be operated, for longer range anti-submarine and anti-surface operations.

Apollo was fitted with a large Type 965 long range air search radar on the ship's mainmast, with a Type 993 short range air/surface target indicating radar and Type 978 navigation radar carried on the ship's foremast. An MRS3 fire control system was carried to direct the 4.5-inch guns. The ship had a sonar suite of Type 184 medium range search sonar, Type 162 bottom search and Type 170 attack sonar.

Royal Navy service

Apollo saw her first action during the Second Cod War in 1973, during the fishing disputes with Iceland, when Apollo, while on a fishery protection patrol, was in collision with the Icelandic gunboat  on 29 August 1973. One Icelandic engineer died later while welding a plate on Ægirs damaged hull, the only recorded fatality of the Cod Wars.

In January 1977 the UK extended its territorial waters from 12 miles to 200 miles to create an exclusive economic zone for fishery rights. Apollo took turns with other frigates to police the North Sea pending the introduction into service of the  fishery protection vessels.

In 1977, Apollo took part in the last Fleet Review of the Royal Navy so far, in celebration of Queen Elizabeth II's Silver Jubilee. As captain of the Second Frigate Squadron, Apollo was responsible for anchorages of all warships at the Royal Fleet Review. In recognition of this work, the admiralty awarded the ship four rather than two 1977 QEII Silver Jubilee Medals.

Apollo was intended to be modernised, (probably involving removal of her one 4.5-inch twin gun, which would have been replaced by the Exocet anti-ship missile and Sea Wolf anti-aircraft missiles, but possibly also involving fitting of a towed array sonar), but the modernisation was cancelled due to the 1981 Defence Review by the minister, John Nott. In June 1982, Apollo was sent to patrol the South Atlantic in the aftermath of the Falklands War, encountering heavy seas that damaged her hull. She returned home in October. In late 1983 Apollo once again returned to the South Atlantic.

Apollo was refitted at Devonport between 30 July 1984 and 17 May 1985 at a cost of £11,000,000, recommissioning on 28 June that year. The ship's armament was unchanged, but Type 1006 navigation radar was fitted and the ship's davits and motor boat replaced by a light pole-derrick to handle lighter inflatable boats.

Sale to Pakistan

In 1988, Apollos Royal Navy career came to an end when she was decommissioned on 7 July and sold to Pakistan on 15 July. The ship was renamed PNS Zulfiqar, and commissioning in the Pakistan Navy on 14 October 1988. From 1991 to 1993 she underwent a major refit and her 20 mm guns and Seacat system were replaced by twin 25 mm mounts, and her Westland Wasp was replaced by an SA 319B Alouette III helicopter. Zulfiqar continued in service for 18 years with the Pakistan Navy until 29 October 2006 when she was decommissioned into training.

Fate
On 12 March 2010, Zulfiqar was sunk as a target in the Arabian Sea. Torpedoes and missiles were fired from an F-22P frigate, P3C aircraft and an Agosta 90B submarine.

References

Publications
 
 
 
 
 
 
 
 

 

Leander-class frigates
1970 ships
Frigates of the Pakistan Navy
Pakistan–United Kingdom relations
Ships sunk as targets